Runnymede College is a co-educational private school located in La Moraleja, Madrid, Spain. It was founded in 1967 by Arthur Powell CBE as the first British school in Spain. It is a private non-denominational school offering a British education to boys and girls of all nationalities from the age of two to eighteen.

The education offered follows the English National Curriculum, with pupils taking IGCSEs at the end of Year 11 and their A-levels at the end of Year 13. Runnymede has been referred to as probably the most academically achieving British school overseas, scoring higher than many of the prominent English Public Schools.

As of 2010 there were 750 students, with about 50% being from Spanish families and 20% being from British families; there were 37 nationalities in the student body. Warwick Mansell of The Telegraph wrote that Runnymede was "medium-sized" in terms of its student body.

History
Runnymede College was founded as a private senior school in 1967, to provide a British education for English-speaking students of all nationalities who were resident in Madrid. In 1987 the primary school was inaugurated. In 1998 the school moved to its current location.

Notable alumni

Notable alumni include Grand Duchess Maria Vladimirovna of Russia, her son Grand Duke George Mikhailovich of Russia, rugby union England player Simon Shaw and women's rights activist Elif Shafak.

See also
 British migration to Spain
 Education in the United Kingdom

References

External links 
 Runnymede College – official website

Educational institutions established in 1967
International schools in the Community of Madrid
British international schools in Spain
Schools in Alcobendas
1967 establishments in Spain